Charles Bendheim (May 15, 1866 – April 30, 1934) was an American politician who served in the Virginia House of Delegates.

References

External links 

Democratic Party members of the Virginia House of Delegates
19th-century American politicians
1866 births
1934 deaths